Federico Sandi (born 12 August 1989 in Voghera) is an Italian motorcycle racer. He competes in the European Superstock 1000 Championship aboard a Ducati 1199 Panigale. He has competed at international level in the 125cc World Championship, the 250cc World Championship and the Superbike World Championship.

Career statistics

Grand Prix motorcycle racing

By season

Races by year
(key)

Superbike World Championship

Races by year

References

External links
 
Profile on MotoGP.com
Profile on WorldSBK.com

1989 births
Italian motorcycle racers
Living people
Superbike World Championship riders
FIM Superstock 1000 Cup riders
125cc World Championship riders
250cc World Championship riders